Wladimiro Boccali (born 7 June 1970 in Perugia) is an Italian politician.

He is a member of the Democratic Party and served as Mayor of Perugia from June 2009 to June 2014. Boccali ran for a second term at the 2014 elections but lost to the centre-right candidate Andrea Romizi.

See also
List of mayors of Perugia

References

External links
 

1970 births
Living people
Mayors of Perugia
Democratic Party (Italy) politicians